Vesela may refer to:

 Veselá (disambiguation), Czechia-related topics
 Vesela, Bugojno, a village in Bosnia and Herzegovina
 Vesela, Croatia, a village in Croatia

See also